Thomas Steven Day (born 24 October 1997) is an English footballer who plays for Horsham.

Career
Day played youth football for Crystal Palace, where he signed a two-year scholarship in 2014. He left after one year of his scholarship and joined Barnet as a second-year scholar for the 2015–16 season. He made his Football League debut when he came on as a substitute against Crawley Town on the final day of the 2015–16 season. Day joined Staines Town on loan for a month in September 2016 – this loan was later extended beyond January 2017. Day joined Hemel Hempstead Town on loan in September 2017. This loan was extended until the end of the season in November. He was released by Barnet at the end of the 2017–18 season. After playing for Hemel at the start of the following season he then joined Eastbourne Borough. In September 2018 he joined Lewes on a one-month loan. This was later extended for the entire season and he joined the Rooks permanently the following summer. He joined Horsham for the 2020-21 season.

Career statistics

References

External links

1997 births
Living people
English footballers
Association football defenders
Crystal Palace F.C. players
Barnet F.C. players
Staines Town F.C. players
Hemel Hempstead Town F.C. players
Eastbourne Borough F.C. players
Lewes F.C. players
Horsham F.C. players
English Football League players
National League (English football) players
Isthmian League players
People from Redhill, Surrey